Van Pier railway station is a railway station and pier in Van, Turkey. TCDD Taşımacılık operates a ferry between Van and Tatvan, which also carries freight railcars and automobiles across the lake. Up until July 2015, the Trans-Asia Express, from Tehran, Iran, stopped at the station. Passengers would travel to Tatvan via ferry, where the western half of the train would continue to Ankara. As of mid-2015, freight trains are the only rail traffic at the station. Van Pier is the western terminus of the Van-Sufian railway, which is not connected to the rest of the Turkish railway network.

Van Pier station was opened in 1971 by the Turkish State Railways.

References

Railway stations in Van Province
Railway stations opened in 1971
1971 establishments in Turkey
Lake Van